The Grumman G-132 was an unbuilt aircraft designed by Grumman in the 1950s. The design was initiated to meet a requirement of the United States Navy (USN) for an anti-submarine warfare seaplane.

Design and development
The design was for a flying boat that would make use of boundary layer control (BLC) to achieve slow speed flight. It was intended that this would enable the aircraft to land on the open ocean in rough seas and deploy a dipping sonar. The Grumman G-132 was the largest of the three design proposals to be submitted as part of the "Open Ocean Seaplane" requirement, but unlike the Convair XP6Y and Martin P7M SubMaster, it never received a Navy designation.

Specifications (G-132 projected)

References

G-132
Cancelled military aircraft projects of the United States
Flying boats
Parasol-wing aircraft